John Nyamekye (born 7 July 1994) is a Ghanaian professional footballer who plays as a midfielder for Ghanaian Premier League side Elmina Sharks. He previously playing for Dormaa-based team Aduana Stars and Bechem United.

Career

Bechem United 
Nyamekye started his career with Bechem United in 2015. He played there till 2019, when he secured a move to Aduana Stars.

Aduana Stars 
Nyamekye joined Aduana Stars in January 2020 during the 2019–20 Ghana Premier League season. He made his debut on 19 February 2020, playing the full 90 minutes in goalless draw against Ashanti Gold. He did not make any extra appearance after that as the league was cancelled as a result of the COVID-19 pandemic in June 2020. In November 2020, he was named in the club's squad list for the 2020–21 season as the league was set to restart in November 2020, However, in March 2021 after featuring in 2 league matches he left the club during the second transfer period to join Elmina Sharks.

Elmina Sharks 
In March 2021, Nyamekye joined Elmina Sharks during the second round of the transfer period after starting the season with Aduana Stars. He made his debut on 4 April 2021, coming on in the 62nd minute for Augustine Owusu in a 1–0 victory over rivals Cape Coast Ebusua Dwarfs.

References

External links 
 

1994 births
Living people
Place of birth missing (living people)
Ghanaian footballers
Association football midfielders
Bechem United F.C. players
Aduana Stars F.C. players
Elmina Sharks F.C. players
Ghana Premier League players